Viper Niza Racing, formerly Niza Racing, is a Malaysian auto racing team based in Shah Alam, Selangor, Malaysia. The team currently competes in the TCR Asia Series and Asian Le Mans Series.

TCR Asia Series

SEAT León Cup Racer (2015–)
The team will enter the 2015 TCR Asia Series season with Douglas Khoo driving a SEAT León Cup Racer.

Asian Le Mans Series 
Viper Niza Racing entered the LMP3 category of the Asian Le Mans Series with its Ligier JS P3 contender.

4 Hours of Sepang (2020) 
In the 4 Hours of Sepang 2020, Viper Niza Racing qualified in 15th place overall, 6th in its class out of 8 entrants. During the race, a mechanical problem with its prototype in the 2nd hour resulted in the vehicle being called back to the pits. As a result, it managed to finish in 19th place overall out of 23 entrants and last in its class.

External links

References

Malaysian auto racing teams
TCR International Series teams
TCR Asia Series teams

Auto racing teams established in 2009